Witches' Brew, also known as Which Witch Is Which?, is a 1980 American comedy horror film co-written and directed by Richard Shorr, and starring  Richard Benjamin, Teri Garr, and Lana Turner. It was based (though without any screen credit) on Fritz Leiber Jr.'s horror-fantasy novel Conjure Wife. Herbert L. Strock directed additional sequences for the film.

Plot
As in earlier film versions of Leiber's story such as Weird Woman (1944) and Night of the Eagle (1962), the story is set around a college campus where rivalries for various chairmanships of faculties take place. While the script's touch is notably lighter than in earlier film versions, verging on comedic in places, the story is basically the same.

Several of the wives practice witchcraft in order to advance their husbands' careers. Joshua Lightman (Richard Benjamin) does not believe that his wife Margaret's spells and hocus-pocus have been helping her, and makes her cease practising witchcraft. Immediately things begin to go wrong for Lightman. He cuts himself shaving; he is accused by a male student of having accosted him (which loses him the chairmanship of the psychology department); and a disgruntled female student tries to kill him by sniping with a rifle from the college rooftop. Meanwhile, Vivian Cross (Lana Turner) is controlling several of the other wives via a sculpture of an egg (modeled on a demonic witches' egg they find in a book on witchcraft) in which a being is hatched. This winged creatures whose eyes shoot green flames chases Joshua's car and nearly kills him before Vivian destroys it via her magic. Vivian, who is close to death, then hatches a plot to trade bodies with Margaret. Margaret is sent driving off a pier in her car; but Joshua uses magic to save her. Vivian succeeds in swapping souls with Margaret, but the tables are turned on her; Vivian is destroyed and Margaret is returned to her own body and starts practicing witchcraft again to help Joshua.

Cast
Teri Garr as  Margaret Lightman 
Richard Benjamin as  Joshua Lightman 
Lana Turner as  Vivian Cross 
James Winkler as  Linus Cross 
Kathryn Leigh Scott as  Susan Carey 
Bill Sorrells as  Nick Carey 
Kelly Jean Peters as  Linda Reynolds 
Jordan Charney as  Charlie Reynolds 
Nathan Roth as  Ben Cohn 
Barbara Minkus as  Saleswoman  
Bonnie Gondel as  Marcia Groton 
Angus Scrimm as  Carl Groton

Other versions
Filmed in 1944 as Weird Woman starring Lon Chaney Jr.; and as the 1962  film Night of the Eagle (also known as Burn Witch Burn!) starring Peter Wyngarde and Janet Blair.

External links

1980 films
Films based on American novels
1980 horror films
1980s comedy horror films
American comedy horror films
Films about witchcraft
United Artists films
1980 comedy films
1980s English-language films
1980s American films